Lüsen is a comune (municipality) in South Tyrol, located about  northeast of the city of Bolzano.

Geography

Lüsen (Luson) borders the following municipalities: Brixen, Mareo, Natz-Schabs, Rodeneck, St. Lorenzen, and San Martin de Tor.

Frazioni
The municipality of Lüsen (Luson) contains the frazioni (subdivisions, mainly villages and hamlets) Berg (Monte), Petschied (Pezzè), Rungg (Ronco) and Flitt (Valletta).

History

Coat-of-arms
The emblem represents a knight in armor, with plumes, lance in rest on a horse facing left, both of argent on gules. The emblem, adopted in 1967, resumes an arms used by the administration of the Bishops of Brixen since 1607.

Society

Linguistic distribution
According to the 2011 census, 97.77% of the population speak German, 1.39% Italian and 0.83% Ladin as first language.

Demographic evolution

References

External links

 Homepage of the municipality

Municipalities of South Tyrol